Yaminsky is a rural locality (a khutor) in Solontsovskoye Rural Settlement, Alexeyevsky District, Volgograd Oblast, Russia. The population was 55 as of the 2010 census.

Geography 
The village is located 17 km south-east from Alexeyevskaya and 4 km west from Solontsovsky.

References 

Rural localities in Alexeyevsky District, Volgograd Oblast